Unterwachingen is a village in the district of Alb-Donau in Baden-Württemberg in Germany with its own administration competence.

References

Towns in Baden-Württemberg
Alb-Donau-Kreis
Württemberg